De la Pole Hospital was a mental health facility in Willerby, East Riding of Yorkshire, England.

History
The hospital was located on a site previously occupied by De la Pole Farm. It was designed by Frederick Stead Brodrick and Richard George Smith in the Victorian Gothic style using a courtyard plan and opened as Kingston upon Hull Borough Asylum in December 1883. It became the Willerby Mental Hospital in the 1920s before joining the National Health Service as De la Pole Hospital in 1948.

After the introduction of Care in the Community in the early 1980s, the hospital went into a period of decline and closed in July 1998. The main buildings have been demolished and that part of the site redeveloped for business unit use. The chapel survives as a Grade II listed building and is now used as part of a crematorium.

References

Former psychiatric hospitals in England
Hospital buildings completed in 1883
Hospitals established in 1883
Hospitals disestablished in 1998
Defunct hospitals in England
Hospitals in the East Riding of Yorkshire
1883 establishments in England